The Persecution and Murder of the European Jews by Nazi Germany, 1933–1945 (short: VEJ) is a German book series that contains documents relating to the Holocaust, edited and translated, with scholarly introductions by historians.

Since 2008, thirteen volumes have been published in German, with three pending; the first two volumes have also been published in English. The third English volume was scheduled for publication in 2020.

English volumes

Not available
Not available
Not available
Not available
Not available
Not available

Sources

External links
Official website

2008 non-fiction books
History books about the Holocaust
German non-fiction books
Primary source collections
Holocaust historical documents